Maurice Alexandre Guigue (August 4, 1912 – February 27, 2011) was a football referee from France, who led the 1958 FIFA World Cup Final in Stockholm, Sweden. He was the second Frenchman, after Georges Capdeville, to referee a World Cup final.

References 
 Weltfussball
 Maurice Guigue's obituary 

Maurice Guigue

1912 births
2011 deaths
French football referees
FIFA World Cup Final match officials
1958 FIFA World Cup referees